Christopher Gravett is an assistant curator of armour at the Tower Armouries specialising in the arms and armour of the medieval world.

Gravett has written a number of books and acts as an advisor for film and television projects.

Selected works
 (1985) German Medieval Armies, 1300-1500, Osprey Publishing, 
 (1993) The Norman Knight, 950-1204 AD, Osprey Publishing, 
 (1997) Medieval German Armies, 1000-1300, Osprey Publishing, 
 (1999) Bosworth 1485: Last Charge of the Plantagenets, Osprey Publishing, 
 (2000) Hastings 1066, Osprey Publishing, 
 (2001) The History of Castles: Fortifications Around the World, Lyons Press, 
 (2002) English Medieval Knight 1300-1400, Osprey Publishing, 
 (2002) English Medieval Knight 1200-1300, Osprey Publishing, 
 (2003) Towton 1461: England's Bloodiest Battle, Osprey Publishing, 
 (2003) Tewkesbury 1471: The Last Yorkist Victory, Osprey Publishing, 
 (2003) Norman Stone Castles: British Isles 1066-1216, Osprey Publishing, 
 (2004) Norman Stone Castles (2): Europe 950-1204, Osprey Publishing, 
 (2006) The Normans: Warrior Knights and Their Castles, Osprey Publishing, 
 (2006) Castles and Fortifications from Around the World, Thalamus Publishing, 
 (2006) Tudor Knight, Osprey Publishing, 
 (2007) The Castles of Edward I in Wales 1277-1307, Osprey Publishing,

Children's books
 (2002) Eyewitness Guides: Castle, Dorling Kindersley, 
 (2003) Eyewitness Guides: Knight, Dorling Kindersley, 
 The World of the Medieval Knight,

Collaborations
with David Nicolle:
 (2006) The Normans: Warrior Knights and their Castles, Osprey Publishing
 (2006) Battles of the Middle Ages, Greenwood Press,

References

Living people
British medievalists
British military historians
Year of birth missing (living people)